Jeffrey J. Miller (born 1961) is an American author and historian, best known for his work focusing on the history of professional football. His books include RELICS: The History of the Buffalo Bills in Objects & Memorabilia, Pop Warner: A Life on the Gridiron, 100 Things Bills Fans Should Know & Do Before They Die, Game Changers:  The Greatest Plays in Buffalo Bills Football History (co-written with Hall-of-Fame coach Marv Levy), Rockin' the Rockpile:  The Buffalo Bills of the American Football League, Buffalo's Forgotten Champions: The Story of Buffalo's First Professional Football Team and the Lost 1921 Title, and The Icemen Cameth: The History of the Natural Ice Industry at Lime Lake, New York, 1880–1925.  He is a member of the Professional Football Researchers Association, and was the 2004 recipient of the PFRA's Ralph E. Hay Award, presented for "Lifetime achievement in professional football research and historiography" and the 2003 Writing Award for articles "Focusing on a Significant Pro Football Personality."  In 2021, he and Greg Tranter, with whom he coauthored RELICS: The History of the Buffalo Bills in Objects & Memorabilia, were awarded the PFRA's Nelson Ross Award for "Outstanding recent achievement in pro football research and historiography." Miller lives in Western New York with his wife and son.

Books 

Miller's first book, The Icemen Cameth, was published in May 1996. It told the story of the natural ice industry that flourished in the small community of Lime Lake, New York (the author's hometown) in the late 1800s and early 1900s. This book is now out of print.

Buffalo's Forgotten Champions was published in August 2004. This book chronicled the history of the Queen City’s first National Football League team—the Buffalo All-Americans (1920–23), Bisons (1924–25, ’27, ‘29), Rangers (1926). The All-Americans are significant in the annals of pro football not only for being charter members of the league, but also for having claimed the American Professional Football Association (as the NFL was known in its first two seasons) championship in 1921. The title was later stripped and awarded to George Halas’ Chicago Staleys. This incident, which Miller coined the "Staley Swindle," can be seen as the first link in the chain of events that brought Buffalonians such gut-wrenching moments as “Wide Right,” “No Goal,” and “The Music City Miracle.”

In August 2007, Miller’s third book, Rockin’ the Rockpile, was published by ECW Press. Weighing in at nearly 600 pages, this book is a comprehensive history of the Buffalo Bills’ AFL era. Over 60 former players, coaches and front office personnel, including owner Ralph Wilson, head coach Lou Saban, Hall-of-Fame guard Billy Shaw (who wrote the book's foreword), quarterback Jack Kemp, linebacker Mike Stratton, cornerback Butch Byrd, kicker Pete Gogolak, and wide receiver Elbert Dubenion were interviewed for this project.

Miller collaborated with Marv Levy, the Bills' Hall-of-Fame coach, for Game Changers:  The Greatest Plays in Buffalo Bills Football History, which was released in October 2009. Published by Triumph Books, Game Changers focuses on 36 of the most memorable plays in Buffalo Bills history. Coach Levy concentrated on the plays that occurred during his tenure as the team’s head coach, while Miller tackled the great plays that happened during the pre- and post-Levy years.

October 2012 saw the release of Miller's fifth book, 100 Things Bills Fans Should Know and Do Before They Die, also published by Triumph. Marv Levy wrote the foreword.

His sixth book, Pop Warner:  A Life on the Gridiron, a biography of the legendary coach of the Stanford, Pittsburgh and Carlisle football teams, was published by McFarland & Company in August 2015.

August 2021 was the release date for RELICS: The History of the Buffalo Bills in Objects & Memorabilia, on which Miller partnered with Buffalo Bills uber-collector and historian Greg Tranter.  This book is a new approach to chronicling the history of the Buffalo Bills by telling the story through its memorabilia and various collectibles, including game-worn equipment, one-of-kind objects such as Ralph Wilson's Hall-or-Fame Jacket, cherished mementos from the players including championship rings (and other surprise items), as well popular items such as the Whammy Weenie, Flutie Flakes, game programs, action figures, pennants and much more.  Published by St. Johann’s Press September 2021.

Miller had a second book, a revised and updated version of his 2012 offering, "100 Things Bills Fans Should Know & Do Before They Die," published in the fall of 2021.  The previous work had proven very popular, and the with the Bills' recent resurgence, Triumph Books approached Miller with the idea of updating the book to include some of the players who were making Western New York talk proud again.  Several chapters were updated to include events that had transpired between the original publication date and the 2020 season, such as Tom Flores and Andre Reed making it into the Pro Football Hall of Fame, Ralph Wilson's passing and the eventual sale of the team, and so on.  Seven chapters were replaced with new pieces on Stefon Diggs, Josh Allen, Tre'Davious White, Sean McDermott, the Bills Mafia, and more.

Documentaries 

Miller has appeared as a featured commentator in two documentaries focusing on football history. In 2009, he was featured in the NFL Films production History of the Buffalo Bills, which coincided with the 50th anniversary of the franchise. It is available on DVD.

In 2015, Miller appeared in Time Warner Sports Network's Before The League documentary, which told the story of the evolution of professional football prior to the founding of the National Football League in 1920. The six-part series originally aired in November, 2015. This film is expected to be released on DVD, but no date has been announced.

Miller has also been featured in multiple episodes of the NFL Network’s NFL Top 10 series.

References 

1961 births
Living people
21st-century American historians
21st-century American male writers
People from Cattaraugus County, New York
Historians from New York (state)
American male non-fiction writers